This is a timeline of the Karluks. The Kara-Khanid Khanate is also included, however it is disputed whether the Karluks or Yagmas were the dominant group within the khanate.

7th century

8th century

9th century

10th century

11th century

12th century

13th century

References

Bibliography 
 .

 (alk. paper)

  (paperback).
 

 
 .

 

 

 
 

 

 
 
  
 

Turkic timelines
Nomadic groups in Eurasia
Ethnic groups in Asia
History of the Turkic peoples